The  Oakland Raiders season was the franchise's 36th season in the National Football League, the 46th overall, and the 11th back in Oakland. They were unable to improve upon their previous season's output of 5–11, instead only going 4–12. The team finished the season on a six-game losing streak.

The Raiders acquired Randy Moss from the Minnesota Vikings in a trade for linebacker Napoleon Harris and a first-round draft pick. The acquisition of Moss sought to help with the team's struggling receiving corps for the past two years. However, Moss struggled in his first season with the Raiders, and he finished the season with only 60 receptions.

Offseason 
The Raiders acquired running back LaMont Jordan and defensive end Derrick Burgess in free agency.

NFL draft

Trades 

 Traded LB Napoleon Harris, 2005 first round pick (#7 overall), and 2005 seventh round pick to Minnesota Vikings for WR Randy Moss.
 Traded TE Doug Jolley, 2005 second round pick (#47), two 2005 sixth round picks (#182) and (#185) to New York Jets for 2005 first round pick (#26), 2005 seventh round pick (#230).
 Traded 2005 first round pick (#26), 2005 fifth round pick (#105) to Seattle Seahawks for 2005 first round pick (#23).

Coaching Staff

Roster

Schedule

Game summaries

Week 7: vs. Buffalo Bills 

 Source: ESPN.com

Standings

References 

Oakland Raiders seasons
Oakland Raiders
Oakland